After victory in the Xinhai Revolution, the Nanjing Provisional Government of the Republic of China, led by Sun Yat-sen, framed the Provisional Constitution of the Republic of China (1912), which was an outline of basic regulations with the qualities of a formal constitution.

On 11 March 1912, the Provisional Constitution replaced the previous organizational outline of the government, and came into effect as the supreme law. It was later replaced by a constitutional compact instituted by Yuan Shikai on 1 May 1914. However, it was restored once again on 29 June 1916, by President Li Yuanhong.

The Constitutional Protection Movement launched by the Military Government of the Republic of China in Guangzhou on 10 September 1917, was intended to "protect" this provisional constitution. However, as the Warlord Era divided the country into warring factions, the provisional constitution was gradually superseded by the constitutions issued by each rival government. In the Beiyang Government, the provisional constitution was replaced by Cao Kun's constitution on 10 October 1923. In the Nanjing Government, the provisional constitution was not replaced until 1 June 1931, when the Provisional Constitution of the Political Tutelage Period was announced, although the old constitution was already rarely discussed after the establishment of the Nationalist Government on 1 July 1925. From 1928 onwards, the Nationalists were operating under an Organic Law that had an ambiguous relationship with the 1931 Provisional Constitution as it was not completely superseded.

The Constitution of the Republic of China superseded it in 1946, ending the Period of Tutelage.

Outline of the constitution 
The government system was to imitate the French cabinet: the Senate at the time wanted to restrain Yuan Shikai's ambitions, and they changed the presidential system to a parliamentary system so that Yuan would be turned into a figurehead.
The general principles were to be outlined concisely, regulating the fundamental elements of the nation in principle.
The presidential election would still be held in the Senate according to the organizational outline of the provisional Government.
The Judiciary system was completely independent, which matched the principle of separation of powers: the provisional Constitution regulated that the provisional president and the Minister of the Judiciary would appoint judges separately. Trials were to be administered by judges independently without the intervention of the government.

References

Notes

External links
 Provisional Constitution of the Republic of China 
 . English translation.
Government of the Republic of China
1911 Revolution
Defunct constitutions
Constitution of China
Provisional constitutions
Constitution of the Republic of China